Eilema costalboides is a moth of the subfamily Arctiinae. It is found on Borneo. The habitat consists of montane forests.

The length of the forewings is 9 mm for males and 12 mm for females. The forewings are dark grey, finely lined with whitish at the costa. The hindwings are dark grey.

References

Moths described in 2001
costalboides